Passive daytime radiative cooling (PDRC) is a renewable cooling method proposed as a solution to global warming of enhancing terrestrial heat flow to outer space through the installation of thermally-emissive surfaces on Earth that require zero energy consumption or pollution. Because all materials in nature absorb more heat during the day than at night, PDRC surfaces are designed to be high in solar reflectance (to minimize heat gain) and strong in longwave infrared (LWIR) thermal radiation heat transfer through the atmosphere's infrared window (8–13 µm) to cool temperatures during the daytime. It is also referred to as passive radiative cooling (PRC), daytime passive radiative cooling (DPRC), radiative sky cooling (RSC), photonic radiative cooling, and terrestrial radiative cooling. PDRC differs from solar radiation management because it increases radiative heat emission rather than merely reflecting the absorption of solar radiation.  

Some estimates propose that if 1–2% of the Earth's surface area were dedicated to PDRC that warming would cease and temperature increases would be rebalanced to survivable levels. Regional variations provide different cooling potentials with desert and temperate climates benefiting more from application than tropical climates, attributed to the effects of humidity and cloud cover on reducing the effectiveness of PDRCs. Low-cost scalable PDRC materials feasible for mass production have been developed, such as coatings, thin films, metafabrics, aerogels, and biodegradable surfaces, to reduce air conditioning, lower urban heat island effect, cool human body temperatures in extreme heat, and move toward carbon neutrality as a zero-energy cooling method.  

Application of PDRCs may also increase the efficiency of solar energy systems, dew collection techniques, and thermoelectric generation. PDRCs can be modified to be self-adaptive if necessary, 'switching' from passive cooling to heating to mitigate any potential "overcooling" effects in urban environments. They have also been developed in colors other than white, although there is generally a tradeoff in cooling potential, since darker color surfaces are less reflective. Research, development, and interest in PDRCs has grown rapidly since the 2010s, which has been attributed to a scientific breakthrough in the use of photonic metamaterials to achieve daytime cooling in 2014, along with growing concerns over energy use and global warming.

Classification 
Passive daytime radiative cooling is not a carbon dioxide removal (CDR) or Solar Radiation Management (SRM) method, but rather enhances longwave infrared thermal radiation heat transfer on the Earth's surface through the infrared window with the coldness of outer space to achieve daytime cooling. Solar radiation is reflected by the PDRC surface to minimize heat gain and to maximize thermal emittance. PDRC differs from SRM because it increases radiative heat emission rather than merely reflecting the absorption of solar radiation. PDRC has been referred to as an alternative or "third approach" to geoengineering. PDRC has also been classified as a sustainable and renewable cooling technology.

Global implementation 

When applied globally, PDRC can lower rising temperatures to slow and reverse global warming. Aili et al. concludes that "widescale adoption of radiative cooling could reduce air temperature near the surface, if not the whole atmosphere." To address global warming, PDRCs must be designed "to ensure that the emission is through the atmospheric transparency window and out to space, rather than just to the atmosphere, which would allow for local but not global cooling." 

PDRC is not proposed as a standalone solution to global warming, but to be coupled with a global reduction in CO2 emissions and transition off of fossil fuel energy. Otherwise, "the radiative balance will not last long, and the potential financial benefits of mitigation will not fully be realized because of continued ocean acidification, air pollution, and redistribution of biomass" from high remaining levels of atmospheric CO2, as per Munday, who summarized the global implementation of PDRC as follows:Currently the Earth is absorbing ∼1 W/m2 more than it is emitting, which leads to an overall warming of the climate. By covering the Earth with a small fraction of thermally emitting materials, the heat flow away from the Earth can be increased, and the net radiative flux can be reduced to zero (or even made negative), thus stabilizing (or cooling) the Earth (...) If only 1%–2% of the Earth’s surface were instead made to radiate at this rate rather than its current average value, the total heat fluxes into and away from the entire Earth would be balanced and warming would cease.The estimated total surface area coverage is 5×1012 m2 or about half the size of the Sahara Desert. Global implementation may be more predictable if distributed in a decentralized manner, rather than in a few heavily centralized locations on the Earth's surface. Mandal et al. refers to this as a "distributed geoengineering" strategy that can mitigate "weather disruptions that may arise from large-scale, centralized geoengineering." Desert climates have the highest radiative cooling potential due to low year-round humidity and cloud cover while tropical climates have a lower cooling potential due to the presence of humidity and cloud cover.
Total costs for global implementation have been estimated at around $1.25 to $2.5 trillion or about 3% of global GDP, with probable reductions in price at scale. This has been described as "a small investment compared to the estimated $20 trillion global benefits predicted by limiting global warming to 1.5°C rather than 2°C," as per Munday. Low-cost scalable materials have been developed for widescale implementation, although some challenges toward commercialization remain. 

Some studies have recommended efforts to focus on maximizing the solar reflectance or albedo of surfaces from very low values to high values, so long as a thermal emittance of at least 90% can be achieved. For example, while the albedo of an urban rooftop may be 0.2, increasing reflectivity to 0.9 is far more impactful than increasing an already reflective surface to be more reflective, such as from 0.9 to 0.97.

Benefits 
Studies have noted the following benefits of widescale implementation of passive daytime radiative cooling:

 Advancing toward a carbon neutral future and achieving net-zero emissions.
 Alleviating electrical grids and renewable energy sources from devoting electric energy to cooling.
 Balancing the Earth's energy budget.
 Cooling human body temperatures during extreme heat.
 Improving atmospheric water collection systems and dew harvesting techniques.
 Improving performance of solar energy systems.
 Mitigating energy crises.
 Mitigating urban heat island effect.
 Reducing greenhouse gas emissions by replacing fossil fuel energy use devoted to cooling.
 Reducing local and global temperature increases associated with global warming.
 Reducing thermal pollution of water resources.
 Reducing water consumption for wet cooling processing.

Advantages to solar radiation management 
Passive daytime radiative cooling is referred to as more stable, adaptable, and reversible when compared to stratospheric aerosal injection, which proposes injecting particles into the atmosphere to increase radiative forcing to reduce temperatures. Studies have warned against stratospheric aerosol injection's potential to contribute to further ozone loss and heat the Earth's lower stratosphere further, stating that the injection of sulfate particles "would reflect more of the incoming solar radiation back into space, but it would also capture more of the outgoing thermal radiation back to the Earth" and therefore accelerate warming.

Wang et al. states that stratospheric aerosol injection "might cause potentially dangerous threats to the Earth’s basic climate operations" that may not be reversible, and thus put forth a preference for passive radiative cooling. Munday noted that although "unexpected effects will likely occur" with the global implementation of PDRC, that "these structures can be removed immediately if needed, unlike methods that involve dispersing particulate matter into the atmosphere, which can last for decades."

When compared to the reflective surfaces approach of increasing the reflectivity or albedo of surfaces, such as through painting roofs white, or the space mirror proposals of "deploying giant reflective surfaces in space," Munday states that "the increased reflectivity likely falls short of what is needed and comes at a high financial cost." PDRC differs from the reflective surfaces approach by "increasing the radiative heat emission from the Earth rather than merely decreasing its solar absorption."

Function 

The basic function of PDRCs is to be high in both solar reflectivity (in 0.4–2.5 µm) and in heat emissivity (in 8–13 µm), to maximize "net emission of longwave thermal radiation" and minimize "absorption of downward shortwave radiation." PDRCs use the infrared window (8–13 µm) for heat transfer with the coldness of outer space (~2.7 K) to radiate heat and subsequently lower ambient temperatures with zero energy input.  

PDRCs mimic the natural process of radiative cooling, in which the Earth cools itself by releasing heat to outer space (Earth's energy budget), although during the daytime, lowering ambient temperatures under direct solar intensity. On a clear day, solar irradiance can reach 1000 W/m2 with a diffuse component between 50–100 W/m2. The average PDRC has an estimated cooling power of ~100–150 W/m2. The cooling power of PDRCs is proportional to the exposed surface area of the installation.

Measuring effectiveness 
To measure a PDRC surface's cooling power, the absorbed powers of atmospheric and solar radiations must be quantified. PDRC should not be measured when the surface is in a balanced or controlled state, but rather in a real-world setting. Standardized devices to measure PDRC effectiveness have been proposed.

Evaluating atmospheric downward longwave radiation based on "the use of ambient weather conditions such as the surface air temperature and humidity instead of the altitude-dependent atmospheric profiles," may be problematic since "downward longwave radiation comes from various altitudes of the atmosphere with different temperatures, pressures, and water vapor contents" and "does not have uniform density, composition, and temperature across its thickness."

Broadband emitters (BE) vs. selective emitters (SE) 

PDRCs can be broadband in their thermal emittance capacity, meaning they possess high emittance in both the solar spectrum and atmospheric LWIR window (8 to 14 μm), or selective emitters, meaning they narrowband emit longwave infrared radiation only in the infrared window.

In theory, selective thermal emitters can achieve higher cooling power. However, selective emitters also face additional challenges in real-world applications that can weaken their performance, such as from dropwise condensation, which is common even in semi-arid environments, that can accumulate on the PDRC surface even when it has been made hydrophobic and alter the narrowband emission. Broadband emitters also outperform selective materials when "the material is warmer than the ambient air, or when its sub-ambient surface temperature is within the range of several degrees." 

Both emitters can be advantageous for different types of applications. Broadband emitters may be less problematic for horizontal applications, such as on roofs, whereas selective emitters may be more useful if implemented on vertical surfaces like building facades, where dropwise condensation is inconsequential and their stronger cooling power can be actualized.  

Broadband emitters can be made angle-dependent to potentially enhance their cooling performance. Polydimethylsiloxane (PDMS) is a common broadband emitter used for PDRC. Most PDRC materials are broadband primarily credited to their lower cost and higher performance at above-ambient temperatures.

Hybrid systems 
Combining PDRCs with other systems may increase their cooling power. When included in a combined thermal insulation, evaporative cooling, and radiative cooling system consisting of "a solar reflector, a water-rich and IR-emitting evaporative layer, and a vapor-permeable, IR-transparent, and solar-reflecting insulation layer," 300% higher ambient cooling power was demonstrated. This could extend the shelf life of food by 40% in humid climates and 200% in dry climates without refrigeration. The system however requires water "re-charges" to maintain its cooling power, with more frequent re-charges in hot climates than cooler climates.

A dual-mode asymmetric photonic mirror (APM) consisting of silicon-based diffractive gratings could achieve all-season cooling, even under cloudy and humid conditions, as well as heating. The cooling power of APM could perform 80% more when compared to standalone radiative coolers. Under cloudy sky, it could achieve 8 °C more cooling and, for heating, 5.7 °C higher.

Climatic variations 
The global cooling potential of various areas around the world varies primarily based on climate zones and the presence of weather patterns and events. Dry and hot regions generally have a higher radiative cooling power (estimated up to 120 W/m2), while colder regions or those with high humidity or cloud cover generally have lower global cooling potentials. The cooling potential of various regions can also change from winter to summer due to shifts in humidity and cloud cover. Studies mapping the daytime radiative cooling potential have been done for China and India, the United States, and on a continental scale across Europe.

Regional cooling potential

Desert climates 

Dry regions such as western Asia, north Africa, Australia and the southwestern United States are ideal for PDRC application due to the relative lack of humidity and cloud cover in both winter and summer. The cooling potential for desert regions has been estimated at "in the higher range of 80–110 W/m2," as per Aili et al. and 120 W/m2 as per Yin et al. The Sahara Desert and western Asia is the largest area on Earth with a high cooling potential in both winter and summer.

The cooling potential of desert regions risks being relatively unfulfilled due to very low population densities, which may lower interest in applying PDRCs for local cooling. However, in the event of global implementation, lowly populated or unpopulated desert climates may be an important "land surface contribution to the planetary albedo" which could "reduce air temperature near the surface, if not the whole atmosphere."

Temperate climates 
Temperate climates have a high radiative cooling potential and higher average population densities when compared to desert climates, which may increase willingness to apply PDRCs in these zones. This is because these climatic zones tend to be "transitional" zones between dry and humid climates. High population areas in temperate climatic zones may be susceptible to an "overcooling" effect from PDRCs (see: overcooling section below) due to temperature shifts from hot summers to mild winters, which can be overcome with the modification of PDRCs to adjust for temperature shifts.

Tropical climates 

While passive radiative cooling technologies have proven successful in mid-latitude regions of Earth, to reach the same level of performance has faced more difficulties in tropical climates. This has primarily been attributed to the higher solar irradiance and atmospheric radiation of these zones, particularly humidity and cloud cover. The average cooling potential of hot and humid climates varies between 10–40 W/m2, which is significantly lower than hot and dry climates.  

For example, the cooling potential of most of southeast Asia and the Indian subcontinent is significantly diminished in the summer due to a dramatic increase in humidity, dropping as low as 10–30 W/m2. Other similar zones, such as tropical savannah areas in Africa, see a more modest decline during summer, dropping to 20–40 W/m2. However, tropical regions generally have a higher albedo or radiative forcing due to sustained cloud cover and thus their land surface contributes less to planetary albedo. 

A study by Han et al. determined criteria for a PDRC surface in tropical climates to have a solar reflectance of at least 97% and an infrared emittance of at least 80% to achieve sub-ambient temperatures in tropical climates. The researchers used a BK coating with a "solar reflectance and infrared emittance (8–13 μm) of 98.4% and 95% respectively" in the tropical climate of Singapore and achieved a "sustained daytime sub-ambient temperature of 2°C" under direct solar intensity of 1000 W/m2.

Variables

Humidity and cloud coverage 

Humidity and cloud coverage significantly weaken PDRC effectiveness. A study by Huang et al. noted that "vertical variations of both vapor concentration and temperature in the atmosphere" can have a considerable impact on radiative coolers. The authors put forth that aerosol and cloud coverage can also weaken the effectiveness of radiators and thus concluded that adaptable "design strategies of radiative coolers" are needed to maximize effectiveness under these climatic conditions. Regions with high humidity and cloud cover have less global cooling potential than areas with low humidity and cloud cover.

Dropwise condensation 
The formation of dropwise condensation on PDRC surfaces can alter the infrared emittance of the surface of selective PDRC emitters, which can weaken their performance. Even in semi-arid environments, dew formation on PDRC surfaces can occur. Thus, the cooling power of selective emitters "may broaden the narrowband emittances of the selective emitter and reduce their sub-ambient cooling power and their supposed cooling benefits over broadband emitters," as per Simsek et al., who discuss the implications on the performance of selective emitters:In showing that dropwise condensation on horizontal emitters leads to broadband emittance regardless of the emitter, our work shows that the assumed benefits of selective emitters are even smaller when it comes to the largest application of radiative cooling – cooling roofs of buildings. However, recently, it has been shown that for vertical building facades experiencing broadband summertime terrestrial heat gains and wintertime losses, selective emitters can achieve seasonal thermoregulation and energy savings. Since dew formation appears less likely on vertical surfaces even in exceptionally humid environments, the thermoregulatory benefits of selective emitters will likely persist in both humid and dry operating conditions.

Rain 

Rain can generally help clean PDRC surfaces that have been covered with dust, dirt, or other debris and improve their reflectivity. However, in humid areas, consistent rain can result in heavy water accumulation on PDRC surfaces which can hinder performance. In response, porous PDRCs have been developed. Another response is to make hydrophobic PDRCs which are "self-cleaning." Scalable and sustainable hydrophobic PDRCs that avoid VOCs have been developed that repel rainwater and other liquids.

Wind 
Wind may have some effect on altering the efficiency of passive radiative cooling surfaces and technologies. Liu et al. proposes using a "tilt strategy and wind cover strategy" to mitigate effects of wind. The researchers found regional differences in regard to the impacts of wind cover in China, noting that "85% of China's areas can achieve radiative cooling performance with wind cover" whereas in northwestern China wind cover effects would be more substantial. Bijarniya et al. similarly proposes the use of a wind shield in areas susceptible to high winds.

Materials and production 
Solar reflective and heat emissive surfaces can be of various material compositions. However, for widespread application to be feasible, PDRC materials must be low cost, available for mass production, and applicable in many contexts. Most research has focused on PDRC coatings and thin films, which tend to be more available for mass production, lower cost, and more applicable in a wider range of contexts, although other materials may provide potential for diverse applications. 

Some PDRC research has also developed more eco-friendly or sustainable materials, even if not fully biodegradable. Zhong et al. state "most PDRC materials now are non-renewable polymers, artificial photonic or synthetic chemicals, which will cause excessive CO2 emissions by consuming fossil fuels and go against the global carbon neutrality goal. Environmentally friendly bio-based renewable materials should be an ideal material to devise PDRC systems."

Multilayer and complex structures  
Advanced photonic materials and structures, such as multilayer thin films, micro/nanoparticles, photonic crystals, metamaterials, metasurfaces, have been tested to significantly facilitate radiative cooling. However, while multilayer and complex nano-photonic structures have proven successful in experimental scenarios and simulations, widespread application "is severely restricted because of the complex and expensive processes of preparation," as per Cui et al. Similarly, Zhang et al. noted that "scalable production of artificial photonic radiators with complex structures, outstanding properties, high throughput, and low cost is still challenging." This has advanced research of simpler structures for PDRC materials that are more suited for mass production.

Coatings 

PDRC coatings or paints tend to be advantageous for their direct application to surfaces, simplifying preparation processes and reducing costs, although not all PDRC coatings are inexpensive. Coatings generally offer "strong operability, convenient processing, and low cost, which have the prospect of large-scale utilization," as per Dong et al. PDRC coatings have been developed in colors other than white while still demonstrating high solar reflectance and heat emissivity.

Coatings must be durable and resistant to soiling, which can be achieved with porous PDRCs or hydrophobic topcoats that can withstand cleaning, although hydrophic coatings use polytetrafluoroethylene or other similar compounds to be water-resistant. Negative environmental impacts can be mitigated by limiting use of other toxic solvents common in paints, such as acetone. Non-toxic or water-based paints have been developed. More research and development is needed.

The cost of PDRC coatings was significantly lowered with a 2018 study by Atiganyanun et al. which demonstrated how "photonic media, when properly randomized to minimize the photon transport mean free path, can be used to coat a black substrate and reduce its temperature by radiative cooling." This coating could "outperform commercially available solar-reflective white paint for daytime cooling" without using expensive manufacturing steps or materials. 

PDRC coatings that are described as scalable and low-cost include:

 Li et al. (2019), aluminum phosphate coating, solar reflectance 97%, heat emittance 90%, daytime air temperature ~4.2 °C lower than ambient temperature (~4.8 °C lower than commercial heat insulation coating), predicted estimated cost by Dong et al. at $1.2/m2, tested in Guangzhou (daytime humidity 41%), selective emitter (SE).
 Li et al. (2021), ultrawhite BaSO4 paint with 60% volume concentration, solar reflectance 98.1%, heat emittance 95%, daytime air temperature ∼4.5 °C lower than ambient, "providing great reliability, convenient paint form, ease of use, and compatibility with the commercial paint fabrication process."
 Weng et al. (2021), porous PDMS (Polydimethylsiloxane) sponge emitter template method for coatings, solar reflectance 95%, heat emittance 96.5%, daytime air temperature ∼8 °C lower than ambient, avoids hazardous etching agents (e.g., hydrofluoric acid, hydrogen peroxide, acetic acid) or VOCs (e.g., acetone, dimethylformamide, tetrahydrofuran, hexane), "compatibility with large-scale production," tested in Hangzhou (daytime humidity ∼61%).
 Wang et al. (2022), waterborne thermochromic coating free of ecotoxic and carcinogenic titanium dioxide, solar reflectance 96%, heat emittance 94%, daytime air temperature ∼7.1 °C lower than ambient, and "can be produced at a large scale and conveniently coated on various substrates through traditional drop casting, spraying, roller painting, or spin-coating methods" and "switchable [between] solar heating and radiative cooling," tested in Shanghai (daytime humidity ∼28%).
 Dong et al. (2022), BaSO4, CaCO3, and SiO2 particles coating, solar reflectance 97.6%, heat emittance 89%, daytime air temperature ∼8.3 °C lower than ambient (∼5.5 °C lower than commercial white paints), described "for large-scale commercial production" with a predicted estimated cost of $0.5/m2, tested in Weihai (daytime humidity 40%).
 Zhai et al. (2022), α-Bi2O3 colored coating, solar reflectance 99%, heat emittance 97%, daytime air temperature ∼2.31 °C (average cooling power 68 Wm-2), uses "low cost of raw oxide materials, and simple preparation process," tested in Nanjing (daytime humidity 54%).

Films 
Many PDRC thin films have been developed which have demonstrated very high solar reflectance and heat emittance. However, films with precise patterns or structures are not scalable "due to the cost and technical difficulties inherent in large-scale precise lithography," as per Khan et al., or "due to complex nanoscale lithography/synthesis and rigidity," as per Zhou et al. Some researchers have attempted to overcome this with various methods:

 Zhang et al. (2020), facile microstamping method film on low-cost polymer PDMS, solar reflectance 95%, heat emittance 96%, daytime temperature reduction up to 5.1 °C, "promising for scale-up production."
 Zhang et al. (2021), low-cost film developed with a phase inversion process using cellulose acetate and calcium silicate, solar reflectance 97.3%, heat emittance 97.2%, daytime temperature reduction up to 7.3 °C below ambient (average net cooling power of 90.7 W m−2), "a low-cost, scalable composite film with novel dendritic cell like structures," tested in Qingdao.
 Fan et al. (2022), eco-friendly preparation of superhydrophobic porous polydimethylsiloxane (PDMS) radiative cooling film, daytime temperature reduction up to 11.52 °C below ambient, "the film is promising to be widely used for long-term cooling for outdoor applications."
 Nie et al. (2022), composite film made of fluorine-free reagents and SiO2 particles, solar reflectance 85%, heat emittance 95%, daytime temperature reduction average 12.2 °C, manufactured with "a simple preparation process, which has characteristics of low-cost environmental friendliness and excellent machinal durability," tested in Hubei.
 Zhong et al. (2023), hierarchical flexible fibrous cellulose (wood pulp) film, solar reflectance 93.8%, heat emittance 98.3%, daytime temperature reduction up to 11.3 °C below ambient, study is "the first time to realize high crystallinity and hierarchical microstructures in regenerated cellulose materials by the self-assembly of cellulose macromolecules at the molecular level," which "will provide new perspectives for the development of flexible cellulose materials."

Metafabrics 
PDRCs can also come in the form of metafabrics, which can be worn as clothing to shield and regulate body temperatures in times of extreme heat. Most metafabrics are made of petrol-based fibers, although research and development of sustainable or regenerative materials is ongoing. For instance, Zhong et al. states that "new flexible cellulose fibrous films with wood-like hierarchical microstructures need to be developed for wearable PDRC applications." 

 Liu et al. (2022), eco-friendly bio-derived regenerable polymer alginate to modify cotton fiber and then in-matrix generate Caco3 nano/micro-particles, solar reflectance 90%, heat emittance 97%, lowered human skin temperature by 5.4ᵒC, "fully compatible with industrial processing facilities" and with "effective UV protection properties with a UPF value of 15, is fast-dry, and is stable against washing."
 Li et al. (2022), wearable hat constructed of a radiative cooling paper with SiO2 fibers and fumed SiO2, solar reflectance 97%, heat emittance 91%, reduced temperatures for the hair of the wearer by 12.9ᵒC when compared with a basic white cotton hat (and 19ᵒC when compared with no hat), waterproof and air permeable, "suitable for the manufacture of radiative cooling hat to achieve the thermal management of human head."

Aerogels 
Aerogels may be used as a potential low-cost PDRC material scalable for mass production. Some aerogels can also be considered a more environmentally friendly alternative to other materials, with degradable potential and the absence of toxic chemicals. Aerogels can also be useful as a thermal insulation material to reduce solar absorption and parasitic heat gain to improve the cooling performance of PDRCs.

 Yue et al. (2022), superhydrophobic waste paper-based (cellulose) aerogel, solar reflectance 93%, thermal emittance 91%, reduced daytime temperatures up to 8.5 °C below ambient in outdoor test, in a building energy simulation the aerogel "showed that 43.4% of cooling energy on average could be saved compared to the building baseline consumption" in China if widely implemented.
 Liu et al. (2022), degradable and superhydrophobic stereo-complex poly (lactic acid) aerogel with low thermal conductivity, solar reflectance 89%, heat emittance 93%, reduced daytime temperatures 3.5ᵒC below ambient, "opens an environmentally sustainable pathway to radiative cooling applications."
 Li et al. (2022), low-cost silica-alumina nanofibrous aerogels (SAFAs) synthesized by electrospinning, solar reflectance 95%, heat emittance 93%, reduced daytime temperatures 5ᵒC below ambient, "the SAFAs exhibit high compression fatigue resistance, robust fire resistance and excellent thermal insulation" with "low cost and high performance," shows potential for further studies.

Biodegradable surfaces 
With the proliferation of PDRC development, many proposed radiative cooling materials are not biodegradable. As per Park et al., "sustainable materials for radiative cooling have not been sufficiently investigated." 

 Park et al. (2022), eco-friendly porous polymer structure via thermally induced phase separation, solar reflectance 91%, heat emittance 92%, daytime temperature reduction up to 9 °C, sufficient durability for use on buildings and highest cooling effect reported "among all organic-based passive radiation cooling emitters."

Applications 
Passive daytime radiative cooling has "the potential to simultaneously alleviate the two major problems of energy crisis and global warming" while being an "environmental protection refrigeration technology." PDRCs thereby have an array of potential applications, but are now most often applied to various aspects of the built environment, such as building envelopes, cool pavements, and other surfaces to decrease energy demand, costs, and CO2 emissions. PDRC has been tested and applied for indoor space cooling, outdoor urban cooling, solar cell efficiency, power plant condenser cooling, among other applications. For outdoor applications, the lifetime of PDRCs should be adequately estimated, both for high humidity and heat as well as for UV stability.

Indoor space cooling 

The most common application of passive daytime radiative cooling currently is on building envelopes, including PDRC cool roofs, which can significantly lower indoor space temperatures within buildings. A PDRC roof application can double the energy savings of a white roof. This makes PDRCs a sustainable and low-cost alternative or supplement to air conditioning by decreasing energy demand, alleviating energy grids in peak periods, and reducing CO2 emissions caused by air conditioning's release of hydrofluorocarbons into the atmosphere which can be thousands of times more potent that CO2.  

Air conditioning alone accounts for 12%-15% of global energy usage, while CO2 emissions from air conditioning account for "13.7% of energy-related CO2 emissions, approximately 52.3 EJ yearly" or 10% of emissions total. Air conditioning applications are expected to rise, despite their negative impacts on energy sectors, costs, and global warming, which has been described as a "vicious cycle." However, this can be significantly reduced with the mass production of low-cost PDRCs for indoor space cooling. A multilayer PDRC surface covering 10% of a building's roof can replace 35% of air conditioning used during the hottest hours of daytime.  

In suburban single-family residential areas, PDRCs can lower energy costs by 26% to 46% in the United States and lower temperatures on average by 5.1ᵒC. With the addition of "cold storage to utilize the excess cooling energy of water generated during off-peak hours, the cooling effects for indoor air during the peak-cooling-load times can be significantly enhanced" and air temperatures may be reduced by 6.6–12.7 °C. 

In cities, PDRCs can result in significant energy and cost savings. In a study on US cities, Zhou et al. found that "cities in hot and arid regions can achieve high annual electricity consumption savings of >2200 kWh, while <400 kWh is attainable in colder and more humid cities," being ranked from highest to lowest by electricity consumption savings as follows: Phoenix (∼2500 kWh), Las Vegas (∼2250 kWh), Austin (∼2100 kWh), Honolulu (∼2050 kWh), Atlanta (∼1500 kWh), Indianapolis (∼1200 kWh), Chicago (∼1150 kWh), New York City (∼900 kWh), Minneapolis (∼850 kWh), Boston (∼750 kWh), Seattle (∼350 kWh). In a study projecting energy savings for Indian cities in 2030, Mumbai and Kolkata had a lower energy savings potential, Jaisalmer, Varansai, and Delhi had a higher potential, although with significant variations from April to August dependent on humidity and wind cover.   

The growing interest and rise in PDRC application to buildings has been attributed to cost savings related to "the sheer magnitude of the global building surface area, with a market size of ∼$27 billion in 2025," as estimated in a 2020 study.

Outdoor urban space cooling 

Passive daytime radiative cooling surfaces can mitigate extreme heat from the Urban Heat Island Effect which occurs in over 450 cities worldwide, where it can be as much as 10–12ᵒC hotter in Urban areas in comparison to surrounding rural areas. On an average hot summer day, the roofs of buildings can be 27–50ᵒC hotter than the surrounding air, warming air temperatures further through convection. Well-insulated dark rooftops are significantly hotter than all other urban surfaces, including asphalt pavements, further expanding air conditioning demand (which further accelerates global warming and urban heat island through the release of waste heat into the ambient air) and increasing risks of heat-related disease and fatal health effects.

PDRCs can be applied to building roofs and urban shelters to significantly lower surface temperatures with zero energy consumption by reflecting heat out of the urban environment and into outer space. The primary obstacle of PDRC implementation in urban areas is the glare that may be caused through the reflectance of visible light onto surrounding buildings. Colored PDRC surfaces may mitigate glare issues, such as Zhai et al. "Super-white paints with commercial high-index (n∼1.9) retroreflective spheres," as per Mandal et al., or the use of retroreflective materials (RRM) may also mitigate glare, although further research and development is needed. Surrounding buildings without PDRC application may weaken the cooling power of PDRCs. 

Even when installed on roofs in highly dense urban areas, broadband radiative cooling panels have been shown to lower surface temperatures at the sidewalk level. A study by Khan et al. published in 2022 assessed the effects of PDRC surfaces in winter, including for both non-modulated and modulated PDRCs, in the Kolkata metropolitan area. A non-modulated PDRC with a reflectance of 0.95 and emissivity of 0.93 decreased ground surface temperatures by nearly 4.9ᵒC and with an average daytime reduction of 2.2ᵒC.

While in summer the cooling effects of broadband non-modulated PDRCs may be desirable, they could present an uncomfortable "overcooling" effect for city populations in winter and thus increase energy use for heating. This can be mitigated by broadband modulated PDRCs, which they found could increase daily ambient urban temperatures by 0.4–1.4ᵒC in winter. While in the tropical metropolitan area of Kolkata, for instance, "overcooling" is unlikely, elsewhere it could impact the willingness to apply PDRCs in urban spaces. Therefore, modulated PDRCs may be preferred in cities with warm summers and cold winters for controlled cooling, while non-modulated PDRCs may be more beneficial for cities with hot summers and moderate winters. The authors expected "low-cost optically modulated passive systems" to be commercially available soon.

In a study on urban bus shelters, it was found that most shelters fail at providing thermal comfort for commuters, noting that, on average, a tree could provide 0.5ᵒC more cooling. Other methods to cool shelters often resort to air conditioning or other energy intensive measures that can crowd commuters in an enclosed space for cooling. Urban shelters with PDRC roofing can significantly reduce temperatures with zero added costs or energy input, while adding "a non-reciprocal mid-infrared cover" can increase benefits by reducing incoming atmospheric radiation as well as reflecting radiation from surrounding buildings, as per Mokharti et al.

For outdoor urban space cooling, it is recommended that PDRC implementation in urban areas primarily focus on increasing albedo so long as heat emissivity can be maintained at the standard of 90%, as per Anand et al. This can rapidly and significantly lower temperatures while reducing energy demand and costs for cooling in urban environments.

Solar energy efficiency 

Passive daytime radiative cooling surfaces can be integrated with solar energy plants, referred to as solar energy–radiative cooling (SE–RC), to improve functionality and performance by preventing solar cells from 'overheating' and thus degrading. Since solar cells have a maximum efficiency of 33.7% (with the average commercial PV panel having a conversion rate around 20%), the majority of absorbed power produces excess heat and increases the operating temperature of the system. Solar cell efficiency declines 0.4-0.5% for every 1ᵒC increase in temperature. 

Passive daytime radiative cooling can extend the life of solar cells by lowering the operating temperature of the system. Integrating PDRCs into solar energy systems is also relatively simple, given that "most solar energy harvesting systems have a sky-facing flat plate structural design, which is similar to radiative cooling systems." Integration has been shown to "produce a higher energy gain per unit area" while also increasing the "total useful working time." Integrated systems can mitigate issues of "limited working time and low energy gain" and are "a current research hotspot," as per Ahmed et al.

Methods have been proposed to potentially enhance cooling performance. Lu et al. proposes using a "full-spectrum synergetic management (FSSM) strategy to cool solar cells, which combines radiative cooling and spectral splitting to enhance radiative heat dissipation and reduce the waste heat generated by the absorption of sub-BG photons."

Outdoor tests using various PDRC materials, some more scalable than others, have demonstrated various degrees of cooling power:

 Wang et al. (2021), a periodic pyramid-textured polydimethylsiloxane (PDMS) radiative film, cooled commercial silicon solar cells by over 2 °C. 
 Lee et al. (2021), a visibly clear PDRC designed "using a rational design to deploy an optical modulator (n-hexadecane) in SiO2 aerogel microparticles within a silicone elastomer matrix," cooled commercial silicon solar cells by 7.7 °C on average.
 Tang et al. (2022), nanoporous anodic aluminum oxide film, flatpanel solar cell relative efficiency improvement of ~2.72%, concentrated solar cell relative efficiency improvement of ~16.02%, described as "a high-performance and scalable radiative cooler."
 Zhao et al. (2022), a silica micro-grating photonic cooler, cooled commercial silicon cells by 3.6 °C under solar intensity of 830 W m−2 to 990 W m−2.

Personal thermal management 
The usage of passive daytime radiative cooling in fabrics to regulate body temperatures during extreme heat is in research and development. While other fabrics are useful for heat accumulation, they "may lead to heat stroke in hot weather." Zeng et al. states that "incorporating passive radiative cooling structures into personal thermal management technologies could effectively defend humans against intensifying global climate change." 

Wearable PDRCs can come in different forms and be particularly useful for outdoor workers. Readily available wearable PDRCs are not yet available, although prototypes have been developed. This field of research is referred to as personal thermal management (PTM). Although most textiles developed are in white, colored wearable materials have also been developed, although only in select colors that are relatively successful for solar reflectance to minimize heat gain.

Power plant condenser cooling 
Passive daytime radiative cooling can be used in various power plant condensers, including thermoelectric power plants and concentrated solar plants (CSP) to cool water for effective use within the heat exchanger. A generalized study of "a covered pond with radiative cooler revealed that 150 W/m2 flux could be achieved without loss of water." PDRC application for power plant condensers can reduce high water use and thermal pollution caused by water cooling.

For a thermoelectric power plant condenser, one study found that supplementing the air-cooled condenser for radiative cooling panels "get a 4096 kWhth/day cooling effect with a pump energy consumption of 11 kWh/day." For a concentrated solar plant (CSP) "on the CO2 supercritical cycle at 550ᵒC can be improved in 5% net output over an air-cooled system by integration with 14 m2 /kWe capacity radiative cooler."

Thermal regulation of buildings 
In addition to cooling, passive daytime radiative cooling surfaces can be modified to be self-adaptive for temperature-dependent 'switching' from cooling to heating or, in other words, for full-scale thermal regulation. This can be achieved through switching the thermal emittance of the surface from a high to low value. Applications are limited to testing and commercially available self-switching PDRCs are in research and development.

Thermoelectric generation 
When combined with a thermoelectric generator, a passive daytime radiative cooling surface can be used to generate electricity during the daytime and nighttime, although the power generated in tests has been relatively low. Research and development is preliminary.

Automobile and greenhouse cooling 
Thermally enclosed spaces, including automobiles and greenhouses, are particularly susceptible to harmful temperature increases, especially during extreme weather. This is because of the heavy presence of windows, which are transparent to incoming solar radiation yet act as opaque to outgoing long-wave thermal radiation, which causes them to heat rapidly. The temperature of an automobile in direct sunlight can rise to 60–82ᵒC when ambient temperatures is only 21ᵒC.This accumulation of heat "can cause heat stroke and hyperthermia in the occupants, especially children," which can be alleviated with passive radiative cooling.

Water harvesting 
Dew harvesting yields may be improved with passive daytime radiative cooling application. Selective PDRC emitters that have a high emissivity only at the atmospheric window (8–13 μm) and broadband emitters may produce varying results. In one study using a broadband PDRC, the research condensed "∼8.5 mL day of water for 800 W m2 of peak solar intensity." Whereas selective emitters may be less advantageous in other contexts, they may be more advantageous for dew harvesting applications. PDRCs could improve atmospheric water harvesting by being combined with solar vapor generation systems to improve water collection rates.

Water and ice cooling 
Passive daytime radiative cooling surfaces can be installed over the surface of a body of water for cooling. In a controlled study, a body of water was cooled 10.6ᵒC below the ambient temperature with the usage of a photonic radiator.

PDRC surfaces have been developed to cool ice and prevent ice from melting under sunlight. It has been proposed as a sustainable method for ice protection. This can be applied to protect iced or refrigerated food from spoiling.

Unwanted side effects 
Jeremy Munday writes that although "unexpected effects will likely occur" with global PDRC implementation, that "these structures can be removed immediately if needed, unlike methods that involve dispersing particulate matter into the atmosphere, which can last for decades." Wang et al. state that stratospheric aerosol injection "might cause potentially dangerous threats to the Earth’s basic climate operations" that may not be reversible, preferring PDRC. Zevenhoven et al. state that "instead of stratospheric aerosol injection (SAI), cloud brightening or a large number of mirrors in the sky (“sunshade geoengineering”) to block out or reflect incoming (short-wave, SW) solar irradiation, long-wavelength (LW) thermal radiation can be selectively emitted and transferred through the atmosphere into space".

"Overcooling" and PDRC modulation 

"Overcooling" is cited as a side effect of PDRCs that may be problematic, especially when PDRCs are applied in high-population areas with hot summers and cool winters, characteristic of temperate zones. While PDRC application in these areas can be useful in summer, in winter it can result in an increase in energy consumption for heating and thus may reduce the benefits of PDRCs on energy savings and emissions. As per Chen et al., "to overcome this issue, dynamically switchable coatings have been developed to prevent overcooling in winter or cold environments." 

The detriments of overcooling can be reduced by modulation of PDRCs, harnessing their passive cooling abilities during summer, while modifying them to passively heat during winter. Modulation can involve "switching the emissivity or reflectance to low values during the winter and high values during the warm period." In 2022, Khan et al. concluded that "low-cost optically modulated" PDRCs are "under development" and "are expected to be commercially available on the market soon with high future potential to reduce urban heat in cities without leading to an overcooling penalty during cold periods." 

There are various methods of making PDRCs 'switchable' to mitigate overcooling. Most research has used vanadium dioxide (VO2), an inorganic compound, to achieve temperature-based 'switchable' cooling and heating effects. While, as per Khan et al., developing VO2 is difficult, their review found that "recent research has focused on simplifying and improving the expansion of techniques for different types of applications." Chen et al. found that "much effort has been devoted to VO2 coatings in the switching of the mid-infrared spectrum, and only a few studies have reported the switchable ability of temperature-dependent coatings in the solar spectrum." Temperature-dependent switching requires no extra energy input to achieve both cooling and heating. 

Other methods of PDRC 'switching' require extra energy input to achieve desired effects. One such method involves changing the dielectric environment. This can be done through "reversible wetting" and drying of the PDRC surface with common liquids such as water and alcohol. However, for this to be implemented on a mass scale, "the recycling, and utilization of working liquids and the tightness of the circulation loop should be considered in realistic applications."  

Another method involves 'switching' through mechanical force, which may be useful and has been "widely investigated in [PDRC] polymer coatings owing to their stretchability." For this method, "to achieve a switchable coating in εLWIR, mechanical stress/strain can be applied in a thin PDMS film, consisting of a PDMS grating and embedded nanoparticles." One study estimated, with the use of this method, that "19.2% of the energy used for heating and cooling can be saved in the US, which is 1.7 times higher than the only cooling mode and 2.2 times higher than the only heating mode," which may inspire additional research and development.

Glare and visual appearance 
Glare caused from surfaces with high solar reflectance may present visibility concerns that can limit PDRC application, particularly within urban environments at the ground level. PDRCs that use a "scattering system" to generate reflection in a more diffused manner have been developed and are "more favorable in real applications," as per Lin et al.

Low-cost PDRC colored paint coatings, which reduce glare and increase the color diversity of PDRC surfaces, have also been developed. While some of the surface's solar reflectance is lost in the visible light spectrum, colored PDRCs can still exhibit significant cooling power, such as a coating by Zhai et al., which used a α-Bi2O3 coating (resembling the color of the compound) to develop a non-toxic paint that demonstrated a solar reflectance of 99% and heat emissivity of 97%.

Generally it is noted that there is a tradeoff between cooling potential and darker colored surfaces. Less reflective colored PDRCs can also be applied to walls while more reflective white PDRCs can be applied to roofs to increase visual diversity of vertical surfaces, yet still contribute to cooling.

Commercialization 
The commercialization of passive daytime radiative cooling technologies is in an early stage of development.

SkyCool Systems, founded by Aaswath P. Raman, who authored the scientific breakthrough study demonstrating the use of photonic metamaterials in making PDRC possible, is a startup that is commercializing radiative cooling technologies. SkyCool panels have been applied to some buildings in California, reducing energy costs. The company has received a grant from the California Energy Commission for further application opportunities.

3M, an American multinational corporation, has developed a selectively emissive passive radiative cooling film. The film has been applied through pilot programs that are open for expansion. The film was tested on bus shelters in Tempe, Arizona. 3M's film achieved "10–20% energy savings when deployed on SkyCool Systems panels and integrated with a building's HVAC or refrigeration system."

History 

Nocturnal passive radiative cooling has been recognized for thousands of years, with records showing awareness by the ancient Iranians, demonstrated through the construction of Yakhchāls, since 400 B.C.E.

Passive daytime radiative cooling was hypothesized by Félix Trombe in 1967. The first experimental setup was created in 1975, but was only successful for nighttime cooling. Further developments to achieve daytime cooling using different material compositions were not successful.

In the 1980s, Lushiku and Granqvist identified the infrared window as a potential way to access the ultracold outer space as a way to achieve passive daytime cooling.

Early attempts at developing passive radiative daytime cooling materials took inspiration from nature, particularly the Saharan silver ant and white beetles, noting how they cooled themselves in extreme heat.

Research and development in passive daytime radiative cooling evolved rapidly in the 2010s with the discovery of the ability to suppress solar heating using photonic metamaterials, which widely expanded research and development in the field. This is largely credited to the landmark study by Aaswath P. Raman, Marc Abou Anoma, Linxiao Zhu, Eden Raphaeli, and Shanhui Fan published in 2014.

See also 

 Albedo
 Emissivity
 Energy conservation
 Low-energy building
 Passive cooling
 Passive house
 Passive solar building design
 Radiative cooling
 Sustainable city
 Urban heat island
 Zero-energy building

References 

Atmospheric radiation
Climate change adaptation
Climate change mitigation
Climate engineering
Cooling technology
Energy conservation
Heat transfer
Heating, ventilation, and air conditioning
Passive cooling
Photonics
Renewable energy
Solar design
Sustainable architecture
Sustainable building
Thermodynamics
Renewable energy technology